Luke Kendall Adams (born 22 October 1976, in Mvumi, Dodoma, Tanzania) is a male race walker from Australia, who was born in Tanzania. His parents worked as medical missionaries. He is a three-time Olympian for Australia. On 23 June 2000, he was awarded the Australian Sports Medal.

Achievements

References

External links

1976 births
Living people
Australian male racewalkers
Athletes (track and field) at the 2002 Commonwealth Games
Athletes (track and field) at the 2004 Summer Olympics
Athletes (track and field) at the 2006 Commonwealth Games
Athletes (track and field) at the 2008 Summer Olympics
Athletes (track and field) at the 2012 Summer Olympics
Olympic athletes of Australia
People from Dodoma
Commonwealth Games silver medallists for Australia
Recipients of the Australian Sports Medal
Australian Institute of Sport track and field athletes
Athletes (track and field) at the 2010 Commonwealth Games
World Athletics Championships athletes for Australia
Commonwealth Games medallists in athletics
Medallists at the 2002 Commonwealth Games
Medallists at the 2006 Commonwealth Games
Medallists at the 2010 Commonwealth Games